In mathematics, a Minkowski plane (named after Hermann Minkowski) is one of the Benz planes (the others being Möbius plane and Laguerre plane).

Classical real Minkowski plane

Applying the pseudo-euclidean distance  on two points  (instead of the euclidean distance) we get the geometry of hyperbolas, because a pseudo-euclidean circle  is a hyperbola with midpoint . 

The hyperbolas then have asymptotes parallel to the non-primed coordinate axes.

The following completion (see Möbius and Laguerre planes) homogenizes the geometry of hyperbolas:

 the set of points: 
 the set of cycles 

The incidence structure  is called the classical real Minkowski plane.

Any line  is completed by point , any hyperbola  by the two points  (see figure).

We define:
Two points  are (+)-parallel if  and (−)-parallel if . 
Both these relations are equivalence relations on the set of points.

Two points  are called parallel if

From the definition above we find:

Lemma:
For any cycle , any point  and any point  and  there exists exactly one cycle  such that , i.e.  touches  at point P.

Like the classical Möbius and Laguerre planes Minkowski planes can be described as the geometry of plane sections of a suitable quadric. But in this case the quadric lives in projective 3-space: The classical real Minkowski plane is isomorphic to the geometry of plane sections of a hyperboloid of one sheet (not degenerated quadric of index 2).

The axioms of a Minkowski plane

For  we define:
(For the space model of the classical Minkowski plane a generator is a line on the hyperboloid.)

An incidence structure  is called Minkowski plane if the following axioms hold:

 C3: For any three points , pairwise non parallel, there is exactly one cycle  which contains .
 C4: For any cycle , any point  and any point  and  there exists exactly one cycle  such that , i.e.,  touches  at point .
 C5: Any cycle contains at least 3 points.

For investigations the following statements on parallel classes (equivalent to C1, C2 respectively) are advantageous.
C1′: For any two points  we have 
C2′: For any point  and any cycle  we have: 

First consequences of the axioms are

Analogously to Möbius and Laguerre planes we get the connection to the linear
geometry via the residues.

For a Minkowski plane  and  we define the local structure

and call it the residue at point P.

For the classical Minkowski plane  is the real affine plane .

An immediate consequence of axioms C1 to C4 and C1′, C2′ are the following two theorems.

Minimal model

The minimal model of a Minkowski plane can be established over the set
 of three elements:

 

Parallel points:
 if and only if  
 if and only if .

Finite Minkowski-planes
For finite Minkowski-planes we get from C1′, C2′:

This gives rise of the definition:

Simple combinatorial considerations yield

Miquelian Minkowski planes

We get the most important examples of Minkowski planes by generalizing the classical real model: Just replace  by an arbitrary field  then we get in any case a Minkowski plane .

Analogously to Möbius and Laguerre planes the Theorem of Miquel is a characteristic property of a Minkowski plane .

Theorem (Miquel): For the Minkowski plane  the following is true:
 If for any 8 pairwise not parallel points  which can be assigned to the vertices of a cube such that the points in 5 faces correspond to concyclical quadruples, then the sixth quadruple of points is concyclical, too.

(For a better overview in the figure there are circles drawn instead of hyperbolas.)

Theorem (Chen): Only a Minkowski plane  satisfies the theorem of Miquel.

Because of the last theorem  is called a miquelian Minkowski plane.

Remark: The minimal model of a Minkowski plane is miquelian.

An astonishing result is

Theorem (Heise):  Any Minkowski plane of even order is miquelian.

Remark: A suitable stereographic projection shows:  is isomorphic
to the geometry of the plane sections on a hyperboloid of one sheet (quadric of index 2) in projective 3-space over field .

Remark: There are a lot of Minkowski planes that are not miquelian (s. weblink below). But there are no "ovoidal Minkowski" planes, in difference to Möbius and Laguerre planes. Because any quadratic set of index 2 in projective 3-space is a quadric (see quadratic set).

See also
 Conformal geometry

References

 Walter Benz (1973) Vorlesungen über Geomerie der Algebren, Springer
 Francis Buekenhout (editor) (1995) Handbook of Incidence Geometry, Elsevier

External links
 Benz plane in the Encyclopedia of Mathematics
Lecture Note Planar Circle Geometries, an Introduction to Moebius-, Laguerre- and Minkowski Planes

Planes (geometry)